Kalev Lillo (born on 30 November 1966 in Tartu) is an Estonian politician. He has been member of XII Riigikogu.

Lillo was the Deputy Mayor of Valga from  1995 until 1996 and the Mayor of Jõgeva from 1996 until 1999. He is a member of Estonian Reform Party.

References

Living people
1966 births
Estonian Reform Party politicians
Members of the Riigikogu, 2011–2015
Mayors of places in Estonia
University of Tartu alumni
Politicians from Tartu